White: Melody of Death (lit. White: The Melody of the Curse) is a 2011 South Korean horror film by Kim Gok and Kim Sun.

The film was pre-sold in Malaysia and Singapore with the teaser trailer and poster released at the Hong Kong Film Mart.  The movie was a commercial success grossing US$ 5,3 Million and ending up being the highest-grossing horror movie and among Top 30 highest-grossing movies in South Korea in 2011.

Plot 
The girl group Pink Dolls, which consists of A-rang, Je-ni, Shin-ji, and Eun-ju, make their debut on stage but fail to achieve popularity. They and the record company moved to a renovated studio that was burnt down in a fire 15 years ago. Eun-ju's sponsor (someone who funds an idol or group on the condition they receive sexual favors) was credited for making the move, and renovations happen. Eun-ju is bullied by the other three members for her involvement with the sponsor and considers quitting. Her vocal trainer and best friend, Soon-ye encouraged her to remain in the group as she believes they will find success and gain attention with their new song. While cleaning up in the dance rehearsal room, Eun-ju finds a VHS tape titled "WHITE" and plays it in her dorm room. The footage is of an old, unreleased music video. When the group's manager finds her watching the tape, she demands to permitted its song to be remade as their next single.

When Pink Dolls receives overnight popularity with their debut of the song "White," which has become a viral hit, the manager seeks to re-record the song but with the main vocalist overtaking the song. The tension begins to rise as Je-ni, A-rang, and Shin-ji become hostile and jealousy against each other as they fight over the spot. During this time, a ghost attacks the three members on different occasions; Je-ni by strangling her with microphone cords, A-rang by causing her to fall off a music-video set, and Shin-ji by crushing her with camera equipment. Fearing the song is cursed and that she will be the next victim, Eun-ju examines the video with Soon-ye and an editor and from there believe that a trainee named Jang Ye-bin, who died before the studio caught fire, wrote the song. Eun-ju meets up with her sponsor and asks about the circumstances surrounding Ye-bin and replies that she died by suicide. After returning to the rehearsal room in a fit of depression, Eun-Ju finds a suicide note beside power sockets that may have started the fire and she smashes the sockets with a hammer until she fell asleep in the morning.

Confident that the curse is broken, Eun-ju wants to get more attention by reinventing "White" with a new image, including dressing and dying her hair in white, and using the stage name "White"; but she takes credit for the song to her solo performance, and alienates those around her. While Soon-ye was destroying the evidence, she re-watched the video and noticed new details they had never seen. While doing so, she and the editor learned that Je-ni, A-rang, and Shin-ji, who had been hosts for a music television show, died from drinking bleach on air. Soon-ye calls Eun-ju, who is on her way to a venue to perform "White," and warns her that the curse is not over, but Eun-ju ignores her. Soon-ye soon learns that the writer of the song was not Ye-bin, but a back-up dancer who was bullied by Ye-bin by disfiguring her face with acid and caused the back-up dancer to commit suicide by drinking bleach. Her ghost killed Ye-bin, who caused the fire when attempting to burn the suicide note.

Soon-ye rushes to the venue to rescue Eun-ju but is unable to enter the stage with all the doors locked. During Eun-ju's performance, the stage goes blackout, and the electricity begins to malfunctions. Eun-ju's sponsor and manager try to get her off the stage, but they are both killed by stage equipment, and the ghost attempts to attack her. Afterward, the doors all open, and the panicking crowd starts to rush out of the building, Soon-ye enters and she and Eun-ju attempt to reunite, but Eun-ju trips in the crowd and gets trampled to death. The electricity eventually sets the venue on fire. After the incident, Soon-ye destroyed all of the remaining evidence of the song in the studio's karaoke room. However, the karaoke machine announces that the next song playing is "White," alluding to the possibility that the curse has not been broken.

Cast
 Ham Eun-jeong as Eun-ju, a leader of the Pink Dolls, who is a former back-up dancer
 Hwang Woo-seul-hye as Soon-ye, a vocal trainer, and Eun-ju's best friend
 May Doni Kim as Shin-ji, a rapper/dancer who is excellent for dancing performance.
 Choi Ah-ra as A-rang, a visual/singer who is addicted to plastic surgery
 Jin Se-yeon as Je-ni, a lead singer who is insecure with hitting high notes
 After School as Pure
 Yoo Mo-ri as Jang Ye-bin
 Kim Soo-hyun as White
 Lee Jun-ho as Music Fever host

Soundtrack
The soundtrack contains 3 versions of the song "White," the original (the one featured on the VHS tape), another sung by Pink Dolls (Ham Eun-jeong, May Doni Kim, Choi Ah-ra and Jin Se-yeon), and a solo version with just Eun-jeong.

Reception

Box office 
The film grossed  its opening weekend landing at the fifth position of the box office chart. In total the film grossed  by the end of its theatrical run. The film received a total of 791,133 admissions nationwide.

Accolades

Release
White was released in Japan as a DVD on March 02, 2012 by NBC Universal. A re-issue ws released in the same country on July 21, 2017.

References

External links
 
 

2010s Korean-language films
2010s South Korean films
2011 films
2011 horror films
CJ Entertainment films
Concert films
K-pop films
South Korean horror films
South Korean musical films